Taenionema oregonense, the oregon willowfly, is a species of winter stonefly in the family Taeniopterygidae. It is found in North America.

References

Taeniopterygidae
Articles created by Qbugbot
Insects described in 1925